Stręgoborzyce  is a village in the administrative district of Gmina Igołomia-Wawrzeńczyce, within Kraków County, Lesser Poland Voivodeship, in southern Poland.

The village has a population of 420.

References

Villages in Kraków County